YML or yml may refer to:

 Charlevoix Airport (IATA code), Quebec, Canada
 .yml, a file extension for the YAML file format